Salemme is a family name of Italian origin. It may refer to: 

 Antonio Salemme, Italian-American painter
 Erasmo Salemme,  Italian volleyball player and coach
 Frank Salemme (1933–2022), American mobster, boss of the Patriarca family
 Lucia Autorino Salemme (1919–2010), American artist
 Vincenzo Salemme,  Italian actor, playwright and director  

Italian-language surnames